Justice Spear may refer to:

Albert Spear (1852–1929), chief justice of the Maine Supreme Judicial Court
Clay V. Spear (c. 1914–1974), associate justice of the Idaho Supreme Court
William T. Spear (1834–1913), associate justice of the Ohio Supreme Court

See also
Franklin S. Spears (1931–1996), associate justice of the Texas Supreme Court
Spear of Justice, a track from the Undertale Soundtrack.